"Gone and Never Coming Back" is a song by Canadian R&B singer Melanie Fiona from her second studio album, The MF Life (2012). It was the first single taken from the album. It was released January 11, 2011.

Music video
The video was uploaded to YouTube by Vevo on March 10, 2011. It was directed by Colin Tilley. In the video Light bulbs explode, wine glasses shatter, and fire erupts as the Canadian songbird shares her emotional tale of love lost in the Colin Tilley-directed clip.

Chart performance
The song peaked at 37 on May 7, 2011 on the US Billboard R&B/Hip-Hop Chart.

Charts

References

2011 singles
Melanie Fiona songs
Music videos directed by Colin Tilley
Juno Award for R&B/Soul Recording of the Year recordings
Contemporary R&B ballads
Soul ballads
2010s ballads